John Mackey may refer to:

John Mackey (American football) (1941–2011), American football tight end
John Mackey (businessman) (born 1953), founder of Whole Foods Market
John Mackey (composer) (born 1973), American composer of classical concert music
John Mackey (hurler) (1914–1989), Irish athlete in the sport of hurling
John Mackey (politician) (1863–1924), Australian politician
John Mackey (Roman Catholic bishop) (1918–2014), Bishop of Auckland (1974-1983)
John C. Mackey, American football coach
Jack Mackey (John Bernard MacKey, 1922–1945), recipient of the Victoria Cross
John Mackey (Tyler) (1882–1962), Irish hurler

See also 
Jack McKay (disambiguation)
John Mackay (disambiguation)
John Mackie (disambiguation)
John McKay (disambiguation)